Chris Dieker (born July 22, 1987) is an American football quarterback for the Shenyang Black Rhinos of the China Arena Football League (CAFL). After playing college football at Southern Illinois, he played for the Cleveland Gladiators of the AFL from 2013 to 2016.

Early life
Born in Topeka, Kansas, the son of Charles and Susan Dieker, Chris attended Topeka's Hayden High School.

College career
Dieker continued his football career at Southern Illinois. Dieker was a 4-year starter for the Salukis, going 20-9 during that time. He helped the Salukis to two conference championships, and was the 3rd quarterback in school history to pass the 5,000-yard mark for his career.

Statistics

Source:

Professional career
Dieker was rated the 30th best quarterback in the 2011 NFL Draft by NFLDraftScout.com.

Pittsburgh Steelers
After going undrafted in 2011, Dieker signed with the Pittsburgh Steelers on July 27. He was released by the Steelers on August 4, 2011.

Iowa Barnstormers
He played for the Iowa Barnstormers of the Arena Football League in 2012.

Cleveland Gladiators
Dieker signed with the Cleveland Gladiators for 2013. Dieker was serving as the backup to starter Brian Zbydniewski, when Zbydniewski went down with injury, Dieker became the starter for the Gladiators. With the team's playoff hopes dwindling, Dieker delivered a big win for the Gladiators, scoring 8 touchdowns in a win over the Pittsburgh Power, helping keep the Gladiators' playoff hopes alive. He became the starting quarterback in 2016 after the departure of Shane Austin. Dieker was injured in the first game of the 2016 season. On June 10, 2016, Dieker was placed on reassignment.

Philadelphia Soul
On June 24, 2016, Dieker was assigned to the Philadelphia Soul.

Beijing Lions
Dieker was selected by the Beijing Lions in the 2016 CAFL Draft and was the backup to Luke Collis during the 2016 season. On November 6, 2016, during the first China Bowl, Dieker played wide receiver due to an injury to James Romain. Dieker caught 9 passes for 107 yards and one touchdown as the Lions beat the Qingdao Clipper by a score of 35–34. He also scored a rushing touchdown during the game.

Shenyang Black Rhinos
Dieker was selected by the Shenyang Black Rhinos with the first overall pick in the 2017 CAFL Draft.

AFL statistics

Stats from ArenaFan:

References

External links
AFL bio 
Southern Illinois bio 

1987 births
Living people
American football quarterbacks
Southern Illinois Salukis football players
Pittsburgh Steelers players
Iowa Barnstormers players
Cleveland Gladiators players
Philadelphia Soul players
Beijing Lions players
Shenyang Black Rhinos players
Players of American football from Kansas
People from Topeka, Kansas